The contralto voice in opera and classical music has a range which typically lies between the F below middle C (F3) to two Fs above middle C (F5). In the lower and upper extremes, some contralto voices can sing from the E below middle C (E3) to two Bs above middle C (B5). The contralto voice has the lowest tessitura of the female voices and is noted for its rich and deep vocal timbre. True operatic contraltos are very rare. The following is a list of contralto singers who have regularly performed unamplified classical or operatic music in concert halls and/or opera houses.

A–L

Eunice Alberts (1927–2012)
Marietta Alboni (1823–1894)
Marian Anderson (1897–1993)
Fanny Anitúa (1887–1968)
Cecil Arden (1894–1989)
Germaine Bailac (1881–1977)
Fedora Barbieri (1920–2003)
Eula Beal (1919–2008)
Marianne Brandt (1842–1921)
Karin Branzell (1891–1974)
Muriel Brunskill (1899–1980)
Clara Butt (1872–1936)
AnnaMaria Cardinalli (born 1979)
Marie-Louise Cébron-Norbens (1888–1958)
Lili Chookasian (1921–2012)
Belle Cole (1845 or 1853–1905)
Kate Condon (1877–1941)
Clorinda Corradi (1804–1877)
Kathleen Ferrier (1912–1953)
Maureen Forrester (1930–2010)
Delphine Galou (born 1977)
Anna Girò (circa 1710 or 1711–1748 or later)
Louise Homer (1871–1947)
Edna Indermaur (1892–1985)
Jenny Twitchell Kempton (1835–1921)
Gillian Knight (born 1934)
Anna Larsson (born 1966)
Marie-Nicole Lemieux (born 1975)
Gisela Litz (1922–2017)
Louise Kirkby Lunn (1873–1930)

M–Z

Adelaide Malanotte (1785–1832)
Bernadette Manca di Nissa (born 1954)
Marietta Marcolini (c. 1780–1855)
Margaret Matzenauer (1881–1963), who sang mostly mezzo-soprano roles though
Antonia Merighi (died 1764)
Sara Mingardo (born 1961)
Sigrid Onégin (1889–1943)
Rosmunda Pisaroni (1793–1872)
Ewa Podleś (born 1952)
Marie Powers (1902–1973)
Sonia Prina (born 1975)
Maria Radner (1981—2015)
Geltrude Righetti (1793–1862)
Anastasia Robinson (c. 1692–1755)
Sofia Scalchi (1850–1922)
Ernestine Schumann-Heink (1861–1936)
Annice Sidwells (1902–2001)
Monica Sinclair (1925–2002)
Nathalie Stutzmann (born 1965)
Hilary Summers
Vittoria Tesi (1700–1775)
Kerstin Thorborg (1896–1970)
Claramae Turner (1920–2013)
Francesca Vanini-Boschi (?–1744)
Lucia Elizabeth Vestris (1797–1856)
Helen Watts (1927–2009)
Portia White (1911–1968)
Marta Wittkowska (1882–1977)

See also
List of contraltos in non-classical music

References

Notes

Sources
 
 
 
  
 
 
 
 

 
Contraltos
Operatic Contraltos
Lists of women in music